Gwynne Shipman (born Beulah McDonald; November 8, 1909 – September 11, 2005) was an American film actress. She was married to the screenwriter Barry Shipman. They had a daughter Nina, who became an actress.

Selected filmography
 Hopalong Cassidy Returns (1936)
 Trail Dust (1936)
 Battle of Greed (1937)
 Every Girl Should Be Married (1948)
 The Lawton Story (1949)

References

Bibliography
 Pitts, Michael R. Western Movies: A Guide to 5,105 Feature Films. McFarland, 2012.

External links

1909 births
2005 deaths
American film actresses
Actresses from Los Angeles
20th-century American actresses
Shipman family
21st-century American women